Balibo, officially Balibo Administrative Post ( or), is an administrative post (and was formerly a subdistrict) in Bobonaro municipality, East Timor. Its seat or administrative centre is the town of Balibo.

References

External links 

  – information page on Ministry of State Administration site 

Administrative posts of East Timor
Bobonaro Municipality